Stanton may refer to:

Places

United Kingdom 
Populated places
 Stanton, Derbyshire, near Swadlincote
 Stanton, Gloucestershire
 Stanton, Northumberland
 Stanton, Staffordshire
 Stanton, Suffolk
 New Stanton, Derbyshire
 Stanton by Bridge, Derbyshire
 Stanton by Dale, Derbyshire
 Stanton Chare, Suffolk
 Stanton Drew, Bristol
 Stanton Fitzwarren, Wiltshire
 Stanton Harcourt, Oxfordshire
 Stanton Hill, Nottinghamshire
 Stanton in Peak, Derbyshire
 Stanton Lacy, Shropshire
 Stanton Lees, Derbyshire
 Stanton Long, Shropshire
 Stanton Moor, Derbyshire
 Stanton Prior, Somerset
 Stanton St Bernard, Wiltshire
 Stanton St John, Oxfordshire
 Stanton St Quintin, Wiltshire
 Stanton under Bardon, Leicestershire 
 Stanton upon Hine Heath, Shropshire 
 Stanton Wick, Somerset

United States 
Populated places
 Stanton, California
 Stanton, Delaware
 Stanton, Iowa
 Stanton, Kansas
 Stanton, Kentucky
 Stanton, Michigan
 Stanton, Mississippi
 Stanton, Missouri
 Stanton, Nebraska
 Stanton, New Jersey
 Stanton, North Dakota
 Stanton, Pennsylvania, a fictional city in Unstoppable (2010 film)
 Stanton, Tennessee
 Stanton, Texas
 Stanton, Dunn County, Wisconsin, a town
 Stanton, St. Croix County, Wisconsin, a town
 Stanton (community), Wisconsin, an unincorporated community
 Stanton County (disambiguation)
 Stanton Township (disambiguation)

Other
Stanton Park, Washington , D. C. 
 Stanton Street (Manhattan), New York City
 Stanton College Preparatory School, one of the top ranked high schools in the United States
 Stanton Preparatory Academy, Cornwall, New York school to prepare students for West Point and Annapolis

Other
Stanton (surname)
Stanton Garner, American historian
Stanton Kidd (born 1992), American basketball player for Hapoel Jerusalem in the Israeli Basketball Premier League
Stanton C. Pemberton (1858–1944), American businessman and politician
Stanton T. Friedman (1934–2019), American-Canadian nuclear physicist and UFO writer
Stanton Catlin (1915-1997), American art historian
Stanton Magnetics, designer and manufacturer of audio products
Stanton Warriors, UK-based breakbeat group
Stanton number, a dimensionless number relating fluid heat transfer and thermal capacity.
, a World War II destroyer escort of the U.S. Navy

See also
Fort Stanton, New Mexico, United States
New Stanton, Pennsylvania, United States
 St. Anton, Austria
Staunton (disambiguation)